William L. C. Lindsay (3 March 1916 – 23 May 1971) was a British and Scottish international field hockey player who competed in the 1948 Summer Olympics.

He was a member of the British field hockey team, which won the silver medal.

References

External links
 
William Lindsay's profile at Sports Reference.com

1916 births
1971 deaths
British male field hockey players
Olympic field hockey players of Great Britain
Field hockey players at the 1948 Summer Olympics
Olympic silver medallists for Great Britain
Olympic medalists in field hockey
Medalists at the 1948 Summer Olympics